This is the discography of English musician Alan Price.

Albums

Studio albums

Live albums

Soundtrack albums

Compilation albums

EPs

Singles

Notes

References

Discographies of British artists
Pop music discographies
Rock music discographies